Symphyotrichum laeve (formerly Aster laevis) is a flowering plant native to Canada, the United States, and Coahuila (Mexico). It has the common names of smooth blue aster, smooth aster, smooth-leaved aster, glaucous Michaelmas-daisy and glaucous aster.

Description
Its leaves are arranged alternately on the stems, and their shape varies among lanceolate, oblong-ovate, oblong-obovate, and ovate. They are usually hairless, and the leaf edges are entire or bluntly or sharply toothed (crenate or serrate), sometimes with smaller teeth (serrulate).

The flower heads are arranged in clusters (panicles). Each flower head has 13 to 23 ray florets with pale to dark blue or purple petals (laminae), and 19 to 33 disc florets that start out yellow and eventually turn purplish-red.

The seeds are cypselae with pappi (bristles at their tips). Like the hairs on dandelion seeds, the pappi allow the seeds to be spread by the wind.

Taxonomy
There are four varieties: Symphyotrichum laeve var. laeve, S. laeve var. geyeri (Geyer's aster), S. laeve var. concinnum, and S. laeve var. purpuratum.

Hybrids with this species and others of the genus have been reported, including three named as follows:
 Symphyotrichum × gravesii between S. laeve var. laeve and S. dumosum;
 Symphyotrichum × versicolor between S. laeve var. laeve and S. novi-belgii var. novi-belgii; and,
 Symphyotrichum × woldenii between S. laeve var. laeve and S. praealtum, which instead may be between S. oolentangiense and S. praealtum.

Distribution and habitat 
Symphyotrichum laeve varieties are native to Canada, the United States, and Coahuila (Mexico). The species is introduced in Québec and New Brunswick.

S. laeve grows in fields, open woods, and along roadsides in rocky or dry soil and full sun.

Ecology 
Symphyotrichum laeve blooms in late summer and early fall. It is pollinated by many native bees and attracts butterflies. It is a larval host for the pearl crescent butterfly (Phyciodes tharos).

Citations

References

External links 

 Astereae Lab - University of Waterloo
 Ontario Wildflowers

laeve
Flora of Canada
Flora of the United States
Plants used in traditional Native American medicine
Plants described in 1753
Taxa named by Carl Linnaeus